Draba hookeri is a species of flowering plant in the family Brassicaceae. It is found only in Ecuador.
Its natural habitats are subtropical or tropical high-altitude grassland and rocky areas. It is threatened by habitat loss.

References

hookeri
Endemic flora of Ecuador
Near threatened flora of South America
Taxonomy articles created by Polbot